Vernon Knowles (1899–1968) was an Australian writer, born in Adelaide.

He attended the University of Western Australia but did not complete a degree. With some encouragement from Walter Murdoch, he turned to writing. He became an expatriate, living mostly in England.

Knowles wrote a series of fantasy stories, The Street of Queer Houses and other Tales. Neil Barron has stated: "Knowles's work is in the tradition of Richard Garnett and has affinities with the work of Lord Dunsany and Donald Corley, but he affects a more naive and relaxed style than any of these. His best stories are amusing literary confections."

He died in London in 1968.

Works
Songs and Preludes (1917) poetry
Lamps and Vine Leaves (1919), poetry, with Charles Rischbieth Jury and Edward James Ranembe Morgan 
Bypaths (1921)
The Street of Queer Houses: And Other Stories (1924)
Poems (1925)
Here and Otherwhere (1926) stories
Beads of Coloured Days: a study in behaviour (1926)
Silver Nutmegs (1927) stories
The Ripening Years (1927) poetry
The Ladder (1929)
Pitiful Dust. A study in frustration (1931)
Two and Two Make Five (1935)
Eternity In An Hour, a study in childhood (1932) memoir
The Experience of Poetry (1935)
Prince Jonathan. A dramatic lyric (1935)
Love Is My Enemy (1947) 
Sapphires: Here and Otherwhere and Silver Nutmegs (1978, reprint)

References

External links
AustLit page
A balance between sense and sensibility, 4 April 2007, article in The Australian
Bibliography at Fantastic Fiction
 
 

1899 births
1968 deaths
Australian male short story writers
Australian expatriates in England
Australian fantasy writers
20th-century Australian poets
Australian male poets
20th-century Australian short story writers
20th-century Australian male writers